Saguinine gammaherpesvirus 1 (SgHV-1) is a species of virus of uncertain generic placement in the subfamily Gammaherpesvirinae, family Herpesviridae, and order Herpesvirales.

References

External links
 

Gammaherpesvirinae